Frank C. Barnes (June 25, 1918 in Chicago, Cook, Illinois - December 17, 1992 in Templeton, California) was an American lawyer and internationally known author and cartridge designer.

History
Barnes was born in Chicago. He did his military service from 1945 to 1947. At Truckee Meadows Community College he was a department head ("Criminal Justice Department Chairman"). He had a master's degree in Justice. He was the author of Cartridges of the World and the designer of the .308×1.5" Barnes, the .458×1.5in, and the .458×2" American.

References 

1918 births
1992 deaths
Ammunition designers
People from Chicago